Arnold Rene Campbell (born November 13, 1962) is a former American football defensive end who played one season for the Buffalo Bills in 1987. He was a replacement player. He also played in the Arena football League and the Canadian Football League.

Early life
Arnold Campbell was born on November 13, 1962 in Charleston, Mississippi and attended at Charleston High School.

College career
He went to college at Alcorn St.

Professional career

Buffalo Bills
1987 Season

Campbell was a replacement player for the Buffalo Bills. He played three games.

Ottawa Rough Riders
1989 Season

In 1989, he played two games for the Ottawa Rough Riders. He was a defensive tackle.

Detroit Drive
1990 Season

In 1990 he played for the Detroit Drive of the Arena Football League. In 12 games he had 12 tackles and one fumble recovery.

Orlando Predators
1991 Season

In 1991 he played for two teams, the Orlando Predators and the Dallas Texans. With the Predators, he had four tackles in five games. He also had one sack.

Dallas Texans
1991 Season

His second team of 1991 was the Dallas Texans. With the Texans he had one tackle, he also had a sack in two games.

1992 Season

In 1992 he had 10 tackles in 10 games and two sacks. Campbell also had two forced fumbles and three recoveries.

Arizona Rattlers
1993 Season

In 1993, Campbell played for the Arizona Rattlers. He had four sacks and 11 tackles. He was in the Arena All-Star game. He played in 11 games.

Milwaukee Mustangs
1994 Season

In 1994, he played for the Milwaukee Mustangs, he played in 10 games and had 15 tackles. He also had three forced fumbles.

Miami Hooters
1994 Season

He also played two games for the Miami Hooters in 1994 but he did not have any statistics.

1995 Season

He played in four games for the Miami Hooters in 1995. He had seven tackles before going back to the Milwaukee Mustangs. He had a blocked kick in 1995 for the Hooters.

Milwaukee Mustangs (Second Stint)
1995 Season

He had a second stint with the Mustangs in 1995; he played seven games and had six tackles and a sack. He also had a blocked kick, his second of the season.

1996 Season

In 1996 he played 14 games, the most of any season of his career. He had 12 tackles and five sacks; Campbell had eight passes defended also.

1997 Season

His final season was in 1997; he played 14 games again and had 15 tackles. He also had a sack and a fumble recovery.

References

1962 births
Living people
American football defensive ends
American football defensive tackles
Buffalo Bills players
Ottawa Rough Riders players
Detroit Drive players
Orlando Predators players
Arizona Rattlers players
Miami Hooters players
Milwaukee Mustangs (1994–2001) players
Players of American football from Mississippi
People from Charleston, Mississippi
Alcorn State Braves football players
Dallas Texans (Arena) players
National Football League replacement players